Huonia is a genus of dragonfly in the family Libellulidae. 
Species of this genus are found in Indonesia, New Guinea and Australia.

Species
The genus Huonia includes the following species:

Huonia arborophila Lieftinck, 1942
 Huonia aruana Lieftinck, 1935
 Huonia daphne Lieftinck, 1953
 Huonia epinephela Förster, 1903
 Huonia ferentina Lieftinck, 1953
 Huonia hylophila Lieftinck, 1942
 Huonia hypsophila Lieftinck, 1963
 Huonia melvillensis Brown & Theischinger, 1998
 Huonia moerens Lieftinck, 1963
 Huonia oreophila Lieftinck, 1935
 Huonia rheophila Lieftinck, 1935
 Huonia silvicola Lieftinck, 1942
 Huonia thais Lieftinck, 1953
 Huonia thalassophila Förster, 1903
 Huonia thisbe Lieftinck, 1953

References

Libellulidae
Anisoptera genera
Odonata of Australia
Taxa named by Friedrich Förster